Bap is a Korean name for cooked rice prepared by boiling rice or other grains, such as black rice, barley, sorghum, various millets, and beans, until the water has cooked away. Special ingredients such as vegetables, seafood, and meat can also be added to create different kinds of bap. In the past, except for the socially wealthy class, people used to eat mixed grain rice together with beans and barley rather than only rice.

In Korea, grain food centered on rice has been the most commonly used since ancient times and has established itself as a staple food in everyday diets.

In Korean, the honorific terms for bap (meal) include jinji for an elderly person, sura for a monarch, and me for the deceased (in the ancestral rites).

Preparation 
Traditionally, bap was made using gamasot (a cast iron cauldron) for a large family; however, in modern times, an electronic rice cooker is usually used to cook rice. A regular heavy-bottomed pot or dolsot (stone pot) can also be used. Nowadays, rice cooked in gamasot or dolsot are called sotbap, and are considered delicacies. More nurungji (scorched rice) is produced when making gamasot-bap (cast iron cauldron rice) and dolsot-bap (stone pot rice).

To make bap, rice is scrubbed in water and rinsed several times. This process produces tteumul (water from the last washing of rice). It is then soaked for thirty minutes before boiling, which helps the grains cook evenly. With unpolished brown rice and bigger grains such as yulmu (Coix lacryma-jobi var. ma-yuen), it is necessary to soak the grains for several hours to overnight to avoid undercooking. The grains are then cooked. In a regular heavy-bottomed pot, rice can be cooked over medium high heat with the lid on for about ten minutes, stirred, and then left to simmer on low heat for additional five to ten minutes.

The scorched rice in the bottom of the pot or cauldron, nurungji, can be eaten as snacks or used to make sungnyung (an infusion made from boiling scorched rice).

Types

Ingredients

Rice 
Bap refers to the Korean cooked rice. The Bap is a popular staple dish in Korea and also signifies the Culinary Corpus of Koreans (Chung et al.  2017). The Bap meal offers significant nutrition and energy and is widely considered as medicinal by many Koreans. It has high stickiness and sheen, hence easy to digest due to possession of adequate moisture (Chung et al.  2017). As a result, the Bap meal signifies the Korean cultural concern for medicinal aid from natural products rather than artificial ones. The dish remains one of the most popular in the Korean Cuisine due to its uniqueness from normal cooked rice and added nutritional values. The most basic bap made of rice is called ssalbap ("rice bap"), or often just bap. As rice itself occurs in colours other than white, the bap made of all white rice is called huinssal-bap ("white rice bap") or ssalbap. When black rice is mixed, it is called heungmi-bap ("black rice bap").

When cooked with all brown rice (unpolished rice) or white rice mixed with brown rice, it is called hyeonmi-bap ("brown rice bap"), while bap cooked with all glutinous rice or white rice mixed with glutinous rice is called chapssal-bap ("glutinous rice bap"). Unpolished glutinous rice can also be used to cook bap, in which case it is called hyeonmi-chapssal-bap ("brown glutinous rice bap").

Bap made of regular non-glutinous white rice (polished rice) can be referred to as baekmi-bap ("white rice bap") when compared to hyeonmibap, and as mepssal-bap ("non-glutinous rice bap") when compared to chalbap/chapssalbap.

Rice or other grains 
Bap made of rice mixed with various other grains is called japgok-bap ("multi-grain rice"). On the day of Daeboreum, the first full moon of the year, Koreans eat ogok-bap ("five-grain rice") made of glutinous rice, proso millet, sorghum, black beans, and red bean, or chalbap ("sticky rice") made of glutinous rice, red bean, chestnut, jujube, and black beans.

When rice is mixed with one other grain, the bap is named after the mixed ingredient. The examples are:

Some grains can be cooked without rice. Bap made of barley without rice is called kkong-bori-bap, while bap made of both rice and barley is called bori-bap.

Special ingredients 
Byeolmi-bap ("special delicacy rice") or byeolbap ("special rice") can be made by mixing in special ingredients such as vegetables, seafood, and meat. For example, namul-bap ("namul rice") is made of rice mixed with namul vegetables. Some popular byeolmibap varieties include:

Dishes 
There are many bap dishes such as bibimbap ("mixed rice"), bokkeum-bap ("fried rice") and gimbap ("seaweed rice").

 bibimbap ("mixed rice") – rice topped with seasoned vegetables, meat, mushrooms, eggs, seasonings, and other additives. All the ingredients are stirred before eating
 bokkeum-bap ("fried rice") – rice stir-fried with chopped vegetables or meat in oil
 deopbap ("topped rice") – cooked rice topped with something that can be served as a side dish (e.g. Hoedeopbap is topped with hoe.)
 gimbap ("seaweed rice") – a dish made by rolling rice and various other ingredients in gim (edible laver) and cutting them into bite-size slices
 gukbap ("soup rice") – cooked rice put into or boiled in a hot soup
 heotjesatbap ("pseudo-jesa rice") – a bimbimbap-like dish served with vegetables traditionally used in ancestral rites
 jumeok-bap ("rice ball") – cooked rice made into balls
 ssambap ("rice wraps") – cooked rice along with several side dishes and ssamjang on a leaf of lettuce, perilla, etc.
 yakbap ("sweet rice") – steamed glutinous rice mixed with honey, jujubes, soy sauce, sesame oil, chestnuts, pine nuts, etc.
DolsotBap(돌솥밥, "Stone pot rice") - rice that can be eaten warmly until finished. After eating, you can make Sungnyung.

See also
 List of rice dishes
 Steamed rice

References

 
Korean rice dishes